Tariki may refer to
Tariki, New Zealand, a settlement in Taranaki, in the North Island of New Zealand
Tariki (Buddhism), a concept in Buddhism
Abdullah Tariki, a Saudi Arabian politician